The 1940 United States presidential election in New Mexico took place on November 5, 1940. All 48 States were part of the 1940 United States presidential election. State voters chose three electors to represent them in the Electoral College, which voted for President and Vice President.

Incumbent Democratic President Franklin D. Roosevelt comfortably won New Mexico by a 13-point margin over Republican businessman Wendell Willkie. This was the only election in United States history where a President was elected to serve a third full term.

Results

Results by county

References

New Mexico
1940 New Mexico elections
1940